Larsson is a Swedish patronymic surname meaning "son of Lars".  There are various spellings. Notable people with the surname include:

Academics
Hans Larsson (1862–1944) was a Swedish Professor of Philosophy at Lund University, Sweden
Susanna Larsson Swedish epidemiologist at the Karolinska Institutet, Stockholm

Arts
Annika Larsson, Swedish photographer and video artist
Carl Larsson, Swedish painter and interior designer
Karl Larsson (artist), Swedish-American artist

Actors
Babben Larsson, Swedish actress and comedian
Chatarina Larsson, Swedish actress

Fashion
Alexandra Larsson, Swedish fashion model based in Argentina

Literature
Åsa Larsson, Swedish crime-writer
Stieg Larsson, Swedish journalist and crime-writer
Zenia Larsson, Polish-Swedish writer and sculptor of Jewish descent

Military
Alexandra Larsson, Swedish LGBT officer

Music
Caroline Larsson, Swedish singer, songwriter
Johan Larsson (musician) (born 1974), Swedish musician
Lars-Erik Larsson, Swedish composer
Lisa Larsson (born 1967), singer
 Rolf Magnus Joakim Larsson (born 1963), Swedish singer known professionally as Joey Tempest
Zara Larsson (born 1997), Swedish singer

Sports
Martin Larsson (Rekkles), Swedish League of Legends player
Adam Larsson, Swedish ice hockey player
Bo Larsson, Swedish football player
Erik August Larsson, Swedish skier
Gustav Larsson, Swedish cyclist
Henrik Larsson, Swedish international football player
Johan Larsson (disambiguation), multiple people
Johanna Larsson, Swedish tennis player
Magnus Larsson, Swedish tennis player
Maria Larsson (ice hockey), Swedish ice hockey player
Markus Larsson, Swedish alpine skier
Per Larsson, Swedish sprint canoer
Sara Larsson, Swedish international football player
Sebastian Larsson, Swedish football player

Politics
Dag Larsson (born 1960), Swedish politician
John Larsson, the 17th General of The Salvation Army
Kjell Larsson (1943–2002), Swedish politician
Malin Larsson (born 1980), Swedish politician
Rikard Larsson (born 1966), Swedish politician
Virginia Larsson, Canadian politician and activist

Fictional characters
Gunvald Larsson, sidekick of Martin Beck in novels by Maj Sjowall and Per Wahloo

See also
 Larsen (surname)
 Larssen
 Larson (surname)

Swedish-language surnames
Patronymic surnames
Surnames from given names